Kohlrausch may refer to:

 Eduard Kohlrausch (1874–1948), Jurist, Rector of Humboldt University 1932–33
 Ernst Kohlrausch (1850–1923), Sports researcher and film pioneer
 Friedrich Wilhelm Georg Kohlrausch (1840–1910), German physicist noted for research on conductivity of electrolyte solutions, son of Rudolf
 Heinrich Friedrich Theodor Kohlrausch (1780–1867), director of the Royal Hanover General School
 Karl Wilhelm Friedrich Kohlrausch (1884–1953), Austrian physicist 
 Otto Kohlrausch (1811–1854), German surgeon, son of Heinrich
 Rudolf Kohlrausch (1809–1858), German physicist noted for research on electromagnetism and electromagnetic relaxation phenomena, son of Heinrich

Surnames